Dale A. Clausnitzer (born December 3, 1951) is an American businessman and politician.

Clausnitzer was born in Bismarck, North Dakota. He went to North Hennepin Community College and University of Minnesota. Clausnitzer is an accountant and a business management consultant. He has previously lived in Maple Grove, Minnesota, San Diego, California and currently lives in Broomfield, Colorado. Clausnitzer served in the Minnesota House of Representatives representing the Legislative District 38A including the Western Suburbs of Hennepin County from 1985 to 1988 and as a Republican. Clausnitzer earned honors as the Independent Business Association of Minnesota’s “Champion of Small Business”, “One of America’s Outstanding Young Men” in 1985, and the “Legislative Excellence Award” by the Legislative Evaluation Assembly in 1986 and 1987. In 1997 the Legislative Evaluation Assembly again honored him as one of their all-time “Outstanding Legislators” for his record in the Minnesota Legislature.
Currently, in addition to his Tax and Business Accounting, he is also a Registered Investment Advisor and President of Growth Equity Management Inc.

References

1951 births
Living people
Politicians from Bismarck, North Dakota
People from Maple Grove, Minnesota
Businesspeople from Minnesota
Businesspeople from North Dakota
University of Minnesota alumni
Republican Party members of the Minnesota House of Representatives